Shipping Controller was a post created by the Lloyd George Coalition Government in 1916 under the New Ministries and Secretaries Act (6 & 7 George 5 c.68) to regulate and organize merchant shipping in order to supply the United Kingdom with the materials to fight the war following severe losses.

Shipping Controllers
The first Shipping Controller was Sir Joseph Maclay, later Baron Maclay who was appointed on 10 December 1916.

The second Shipping Controller was Lord Pirrie from 1918.

See also
Minister of Shipping

References

External links

Lists of government ministers of the United Kingdom
United Kingdom in World War I